Oyèdépò is a Yoruba surname meaning "chieftaincy has reached its position". Notable people with the surname include:

David Oyedepo (born 1954), Nigerian Christian author, businessman, and architect
George Oyebode Oyedepo (born 1985), Nigerian footballer
Stella Oyedepo (born 1950s), Nigerian playwright

Yoruba-language surnames